The Suttor Developmental Road is a highway in the east of the Australian state of Queensland. It runs in SE-NW direction and has a length of 167 km. It connects the Peak Downs Highway with the Bowen Developmental Road. It is signed as State Route 11.

Route 
The Suttor Developmental Road branches north of Nebo from the Peak Downs Highway (State Route 70) to the west and south of the Homevale National Park to the locality of Elphinstone.

The paved road ends at Elpinstone after which it hugs the western shore of Lake Elphinstone. Later it crosses the Isaac River. In the locality of Eaglefield it crosses the Suttor River, after which it is named. Finally, it reaches the locality of Mount Coolon at the Bowen Developmental Road (State Route 77).

Sources 
Steve Parish: Australian Touring Atlas . Steve Parish Publishing. Archerfield QLD 2007.  . p. 10

References

Highways in Queensland
Roads in Queensland